Lake Almanor Peninsula is a census-designated place (CDP) in Plumas County, California, United States. The population was 356 at the 2010 census, up from 336 at the 2000 census.

Geography
Lake Almanor Peninsula is located at  (40.275319, -121.126715).

Demographics

2010
The 2010 United States Census reported that Lake Almanor Peninsula had a population of 356. The racial makeup of Lake Almanor Peninsula was 337 (94.7%) White, 0 (0.0%) African American, 9 (2.5%) Native American, 0 (0.0%) Asian, 0 (0.0%) Pacific Islander, 4 (1.1%) from other races, and 6 (1.7%) from two or more races. Hispanic or Latino of any race were 22 persons (6.2%).

The Census reported that 356 people (100% of the population) lived in households, 0 (0%) lived in non-institutionalized group quarters, and 0 (0%) were institutionalized.

There were 165 households, out of which 32 (19.4%) had children under the age of 18 living in them, 95 (57.6%) were opposite-sex married couples living together, 10 (6.1%) had a female householder with no husband present, 5 (3.0%) had a male householder with no wife present.  There were 6 (3.6%) unmarried opposite-sex partnerships, and 0 (0%) same-sex married couples or partnerships. 47 households (28.5%) were made up of individuals, and 18 (10.9%) had someone living alone who was 65 years of age or older. The average household size was 2.16.  There were 110 families (66.7% of all households); the average family size was 2.57.

The population was spread out, with 67 people (18.8%) under the age of 18, 15 people (4.2%) aged 18 to 24, 60 people (16.9%) aged 25 to 44, 130 people (36.5%) aged 45 to 64, and 84 people (23.6%) who were 65 years of age or older.  The median age was 54.3 years. For every 100 females, there were 110.7 males.  For every 100 females age 18 and over, there were 103.5 males.

The homeowner vacancy rate was 16.3%; the rental vacancy rate was 48.6%.  264 people (74.2% of the population) lived in owner-occupied housing units and 92 people (25.8%) lived in rental housing units.

2000
As of the census of 2000, there were 336 people, 156 households, and 102 families residing in the CDP. The racial makeup of the CDP was 95.83% White, 2.08% Native American, 0.89% from other races, and 1.19% from two or more races. Hispanic or Latino of any race were 5.65% of the population.

There were 156 households, out of which 21.8% had children under the age of 18 living with them, 59.0% were married couples living together, 5.1% had a female householder with no husband present, and 34.0% were non-families. 29.5% of all households were made up of individuals, and 10.3% had someone living alone who was 65 years of age or older.  The average household size was 2.15 and the average family size was 2.64.

In the CDP, the population was spread out, with 18.5% under the age of 18, 5.4% from 18 to 24, 21.7% from 25 to 44, 34.5% from 45 to 64, and 19.9% who were 65 years of age or older.  The median age was 47 years. For every 100 females, there were 95.3 males.  For every 100 females age 18 and over, there were 101.5 males.

The median income for a household in the CDP was $26,000, and the median income for a family was $37,250. Males had a median income of $35,139 versus $18,929 for females. The per capita income for the CDP was $15,643.  About 7.2% of families and 14.0% of the population were below the poverty line, including 27.9% of those under age 18 and none of those age 65 or over.

Politics

References

Census-designated places in Plumas County, California
Peninsulas of California
Census-designated places in California
Landforms of Plumas County, California